A transit desert is an area with limited transportation supply. Developed from the concept of food deserts, various methods have been proposed to measure transit deserts. Transit deserts are generally characterized by poor public transportation options and possibly poor bike, sidewalk, or road infrastructure.  The lack of transportation options present in transit deserts may have negative effects of people’s health, job prospects, and economic mobility.

History
The term ‘desert’ has been variously applied to areas that lack key services like banks, food access, or even books.  The idea of transit deserts was coined by Dr. Junfeng Jiao and Maxwell Dillivan, first appearing in print in 2013.  Since that time the concept of transit deserts has been expanded upon and competing definitions and measurement techniques have emerged.

Definitions

Gap-based measurements
Gap-based measurement techniques are the most prominent and well-defined definition of transit deserts. Such methods typically use Geographic Information Systems (GIS) based methods to measure the gap between transportation supply and demand. These methods quantify demand and supply and then subtract demand from supply in order to find the “gap” in transit service. Areas that fall below a certain threshold are termed "transit deserts". Using this method studies have found that nearly all cities in the United States have transit deserts. Studies have also consistently shown that central business districts are almost never transit deserts, but the locations of transit desert areas varies considerably in different cities.

No-transit definition
A more informal definition of transit deserts has also emerged in which areas that lack some type of transportation, most often public transportation like buses and subway stops, are termed transit deserts. Sometimes this definition has been expanded or slightly redefined to refer areas that lack a certain type of transportation such as "subway deserts".

Implications
The causes of transit deserts are much debated. Some have cited suburban sprawl and deliberately segregationist policies as some of the leading causes of transit deserts. Still others contend that transit deserts are often the result of poor planning practices and that better transit planning can help alleviate them.

Examples

See also

General:
 Banking desert
 Book desert
Exurb
 Food desert
Forced rider
Ghetto tax
Isochrone map
 Medical desert
 Poverty map
 Redlining
Urban resilience
Urban prairie
 Underfunded public school system
Transport:
Accessibility (transport)

Freedom of movement

References

Freedom of movement
Economic geography
Transportation planning
Urban decay
Car culture
Neighbourhoods by type